Larissa Ione is a USA Today and New York Times bestselling contemporary and paranormal romance author. She is published with Samhain, Red Sage Kensington and Grand Central Publishing under her own name, and along with Stephanie Tyler she is also one half of the writing team of Sydney Croft, whose books are published by Bantam Dell.

Larissa currently resides in Wisconsin with her Coast Guard husband and seventeen-year-old son.

Bibliography as Larissa Ione

The Demonica series

Novels
Pleasure Unbound (June 20, 2008)
Desire Unchained (March 1, 2009)
Passion Unleashed (March 31, 2009)
Ecstasy Unveiled (February 1, 2010)
Sin Undone (August 24, 2010)
Reaver (January 1, 2013)
Revenant (December 16, 2014 )

Novellas and short stories
Eternity Embraced a short story in The Mammoth Book of Vampire Romance 2 (September 22, 2009) anthology with Jordan Summers, Deborah Cooke, Karen MacInerney, Caitlin Kittredge, Dina James, Camille Bacon-Smith, Rosemary Laurey, Patti O'Shea, Angie Fox, Caitlín R. Kiernan, Jamie Leigh Hansen, Carole Nelson Douglas, Diane Whiteside, Jaye Wells, Stacia Kane, Jennifer Ashley, Justine Musk, Jennifer St. Giles, Nancy Holder, Dawn Cook, Jeanne C. Stein, Tiffany Trent, Ann Aguirre, and Devon Monk. Note: The story takes place in the Demonica series timeline after book three.
Eternity Embraced (Jan 20, 2011) the expanded novella of the short story in The Mammoth Book of Vampire Romance 2.
Vampire Fight Club (August 30, 2011) a short story found in the anthology Supernatural with Alexandra Ivy, Jacquelyn Frank, and G.A. Aiken.
Demonica: Overkill include short stories Wraith and Serena, Tayla and Eidolon, Kaden and Andrea and Luc and Kar (yet to be released). Available for free on her website.

Supplement
The Demonica Compendium. Available for free on her website.

Lords of Deliverance series
Eternal Rider (April 1, 2011)
Immortal Rider (November 22, 2011)
Lethal Rider (May 22, 2012)
Rogue Rider (November 20, 2012)

Other short stories
Bloodlust Available for free on her website.
Flesh to Fantasy story found in Secrets, Volume 18: Dark Passions (December 30, 2006) anthology with Rae Monet, Linda Gayle, and Cynthia Eden.
Wet Dreams story found in Secrets, Volume 21: Primal Heat (December 2007) anthology with Cynthia Eden, Kate St. James, and Mia Varano.

Other novels
Snowbound (July 29, 2008)

Bibliography as Sydney Croft

Agency of Covert Rare Operatives/ACRO series

Novels
Riding the Storm (August 28, 2007)
Unleashing the Storm (February 26, 2008)
Seduced by the Storm (July 29, 2008)
Taming the Fire (April 28, 2009)
Tempting the Fire (July 27, 2010)
Taken by Fire (June 28, 2011)
Three the Hard Way (November 29, 2014)

Short stories
Shadow Play (May 20, 2008) in the Hot Nights, Dark Desires anthology with Eden Bradley and Stephanie Tyler.
Code Word Storm (May 11, 2010) in The Mammoth Book of Special Ops Romance anthology with Penny McCall, Rinda Elliot, Laura Griffin, Charlotte Mede, Shannon K. Butcher, Rachel Caine, Marliss Melton, Charlene Teglia, Michele Albert, Cheyenne McCray, Gina Robinson, Shiloh Walker, Jordan Summers, E.C. Sheedy, Caitlyn Nicholas, Liz Muir, Nicola Marsh, Gennita Low, and Debra Webb.

Miscellaneous
The Write Ingredients (June 1, 2007) Over ninety authors, including Larissa Ione and Sydney Croft, and a handful of dedicated readers, offered up their favorite recipes. The proceeds go toward the Troop Project.

References

Year of birth missing (living people)
Living people
American romantic fiction writers
American women novelists
21st-century American women